The 1919 Kyiv city census was the first census conducted in the city of Kyiv following the Bolshevik occupation of the city in February 1919, taking place on March 16, 1919. The census covered the size, age, ethnic demography, and educational status of the city's population. The final report was published by D.l. Volion, head of the Kyiv Provincial Statistical Bureau, in 1920.

Census-taking process 
The main statisticians assigned to the carrying out and processing of the census were I. S. Bisk and V. S. Dvynianinov, who had also previously worked on the Kyiv census of 1917 during the rule of the Ukrainian People's Republic. There were some procedural issues with the registration of nationality, due to city-census enumerators being allowed to refuse to register people as Ukrainian. Despite this, the census showed an increase in the number of self-declared Ukrainians in Kyiv from the 1917 census, as well as a decline in the number of self-declared Russians.

Results

Population size 
The total population of the city of Kyiv in 1919 was found to be made up of 544,368 people. The chart below lists the population of each district in the city.

National composition 
The most numerous ethnic groups in the city were found to be Russians, Ukrainians, and Jews. The percentage of those identifying as Ukrainians within Kyiv in 1919 increased from 12% to 24% when compared to the results of the 1917 census, while the percentage identifying as Russians fell from 50% to 42%.

Educational status 
The average literacy of the population of Kyiv was found to be 76.5%, 85.4% for males and 68.6% for females. Ethnically Jewish males had the highest literacy rate of any demographic, at over 90%.

References

See also 

Demographics of Kyiv

History of Kyiv
Censuses in Ukraine
Censuses in the Soviet Union
Demographics of Ukraine
1919 in Ukraine
March 1919 events in Europe
History of Ukraine (1918–1991)